Diduni (also Romanized as Dīdūnī; also known as Dīdanī, Didwani, and Dīvānī) is a village in Howmeh-ye Gharbi Rural District, in the Central District of Ramhormoz County, Khuzestan Province, Iran. At the 2006 census, its population was 208, in 46 families.

References 

Populated places in Ramhormoz County